Heidelberg Heights is a suburb of Melbourne, Victoria, Australia, 11 km north-east of Melbourne's Central Business District, located within the City of Banyule local government area. Heidelberg Heights recorded a population of 6,758 at the 2021 census.

History

The first Heidelberg Heights Post Office was renamed in 1950 from Heidelberg West (open since 1923) and closed in 1982. In 1983 Heidelberg North office was renamed Heidelberg Heights; this closed in 1993.

In 2012 the City of Banyule acquired the Haig Street Primary School property at 52 Haig Street which had been closed by the Victorian Education Department. A housing development was built by Metricon on the site.

Facilities 
Public library services is provided by Yarra Plenty Regional Library.  The nearest libraries are at Ivanhoe and Rosanna.

Sport

North Heidelberg Football Club, an Australian rules football team, competes in the Northern Football League.

See also
 City of Heidelberg – Heidelberg Heights was previously within this former local government area.

References

Suburbs of Melbourne
Suburbs of the City of Banyule
Heidelberg, Victoria